The Field Elm cultivar Ulmus minor 'Folia Alba-Punctata' was first identified by C. de Vos in 1867, as Ulmus campestris fol. albo punctatis. The tree is assumed to be U. minor by Green.

Description
C. de Vos described the tree as having leaves dotted, not flecked, with white.

Cultivation
No specimens are known to survive. An 'Album Punctatum', with "white-speckled foliage", appeared in the 1902 catalogue of the Bobbink and Atkins nursery, Rutherford, New Jersey, though this may have been the 'Punctata' more common in cultivation at that time.

References

Field elm cultivar
Ulmus articles missing images
Ulmus
Missing elm cultivars